The Central Bank of São Tomé and Príncipe ( or BCSTP) is the central bank of São Tomé and Príncipe, a Portuguese-speaking island nation off the western equatorial coast of Central Africa.

History

At independence in 1975, the government converted the local branch of the Portuguese colonial bank, Banco Nacional Ultramarino, into the National Bank of São Tomé and Príncipe, which took on the functions of central bank, development bank, and commercial bank. The government created a monobank by bringing the only other commercial bank in the country, the Banco Popular de Angola (formerly Banco Comercial de Angola and now Banco de Poupança e Crédito), under the control of Banco Nacional and by merging its savings bank, the Caixa de Crédito.

In 1992, a reform law resulted in the National Bank giving up its development and commercial banking functions, focusing on central banking. With that reform, the bank took on its present name.  The successor bank for the commercial banking functions was Banco Internacional de São Tomé e Príncipe (BISTP).

Governors
Governors of the National Bank since independence
Victor Manuel Lopes Correia, 1976-1981
Hildeberto Mário do Nascimento Séca, 1981-1983
Prudêncio Rita de Oliveira Rita, 1983-1988
Manuel de Nazaré Mendes, 1988-1992

Since the reform, passed on 24 August 1992, the bank had eight central governors:
Adelino Castelo David, 1992–1994
Carlos Quaresma Batista de Sousa, 1995–1999
Maria do Carmo Silveira, 1999–2006
Arlindo Afonso Carvalho, 2006–2008
Luís Fernando Moreira de Sousa, 2009–2011
Maria do Carmo Silveira, 2011–2016
Hélio Silva Vaz de Almeida, 2016–2019
Américo Barros, 2019–2022
Américo Ramos, 2022–

See also
 Economy of São Tomé and Príncipe 
 List of central banks of Africa
 List of central banks

References

External links
Official website (Portuguese)

Banks of São Tomé and Príncipe
São Tomé and Príncipe
São Tomé
1975 establishments in São Tomé and Príncipe
Banks established in 1975